Mississippi is a state in the Southern United States. According to the 2020 United States Census, Mississippi is the 32nd-most populous state, with  inhabitants and the 31st largest by land area, spanning  of land. Mississippi is divided into 82 counties and contains 300 municipalities, consisting of cities, towns, and villages.

Municipalities in Mississippi are classified according to population size. At time of incorporation, municipalities with populations of more than 2,000 are classified as cities, municipalities containing between 301 and 2000 persons are classified as towns, and municipalities between 100 and 300 persons are classified as villages. Places may be incorporated to become a city, town, or village through a petition signed by two-thirds of the qualified voters who reside in the proposed municipality. The major function of municipal governments are to provide services for its citizens such as maintaining roads and bridges, providing law, fire protection, and health and sanitation services.

, the largest municipality by population in Mississippi is Jackson, with 153,701 residents, and the smallest is Satartia, with 41 residents. The city of Natchez is the oldest municipality in Mississippi, incorporated on March 10, 1803, and the city of Gluckstadt is the state's newest municipality, incorporated in June 2021.

List of municipalities

See also 
 List of census-designated places in Mississippi

Notes

References 

 
Mississippi, List of cities in
Mississippi
Cities